Johann Gerd Krüssmann (1910–1980) was a German dendrologist and author.

Krüssmann worked as dendrologist from 1935, and from 1946 was the owner of a nursery and part-time horticulture teacher at the Horticultural Vocational School in Wesel and the county vocational school in Dinslaken. The Ellerhoop-Thiensen Arboretum was established in 1956 by Erich Frahm, its owner, in cooperation with Krüssman.

Works
 Handbuch der Laubgehölze (Vols 1-3) (Paul Parey, Berlin and Hamburg, 1976); trans. Michael E. Epp, Manual of Cultivated Broad-Leaved Trees and Shrubs (Vols. 1-3) and Manual of Cultivated Conifers (Vol. 4) (Batsford, Timber Press, Beaverton, Oregon, 1984-6)

References

1910 births
1980 deaths
20th-century German botanists
Dendrologists
Scientists from North Rhine-Westphalia